= Revolutionary Labour Bloc =

The Revolutionary Labour Bloc (Spanish: Bloque Laborista Revolucionario) was a grouping in the Senate of Córdoba in Argentina. It was formed after the 1946 election, by four dissident senators from the Peronist bloc; Federico de Uña (chairman of the Unión Obrera del Dulce y Anexos), Carlos Rossini, Godofredo Stauffer (land-owner from Unión Cívica Radical) and Antonio Llorens (who had belonged to UCR). The Revolutionary Labour Bloc emerged as a prominent force in the provincial legislature and spearheaded an impeachment trial against the incumbent state governor. These events led Juan Perón to dissolve the provincial legislature in 1947.
